The Business Archives Council is an organisation based in London that exists to promote the preservation of business records of historical significance. It was founded in 1934 and publishes a journal Business Archives, a newsletter, and books in conjunction with Manchester University Press and Ashgate. It is a registered charity number 313336.

Selected publications

General
 Lesley Richmond and Bridget Stockford. Company Archives: A Survey of the Records of 1000 of the First Registered Companies in England and Wales. Gower, Aldershot, 1986. 
 Lesley Richmond & Alison Turton. (Eds.) Directory of Corporate Archives. 4th edition. Business Archives Council, 1996.

Industries
 Lesley Richmond and Alison Turton. (Eds.) The Brewing Industry: A Guide to Historical Records. Manchester University Press, Manchester, 1990. 
 L. A. Ritchie. (Ed.) The Shipbuilding Industry: A Guide to Historical Records. Manchester University Press, Manchester, 1992. 
 Wendy Habgood. (Ed.) Chartered Accountants in England and Wales. A Guide to Historical Records. Manchester University Press, Manchester, 1994. 
 Alison Turton & John Orbell. British Banking. A Guide to Historical Records. New edition. Ashgate, Aldershot, 2001. 
 Lesley Richmond, Julie Stevenson & Alison Turton. (Eds.) The Pharmaceutical Industry. A Guide to Historical Records. Ashgate, Aldershot, 2003.

References

External links 
 

Organizations established in 1934
Organisations based in London
Charities based in London